Radegonde of Valois (born in Chinon in 1425/August 1428 and died in Tours on 19 March 1445) was a French princess, eldest daughter of King Charles VII of France and Marie of Anjou. She was betrothed to Sigismund, Archduke of Austria.

Biography
Radegonde was born in the city of Chinon in 1425 or August 1428, as evidenced by an act of the Queen's Treasurer General dated 29 August that year, referring to the "gesine recently made in the city of Chinon, Madame Arragonde of France"

The young princess, the eldest daughter of the king, was baptized in honour of Saint Radegund, to whom her father devoted a particular cult. According to Christian de Mérindol, this choice was explained by reasons both political, historical and religious, in this particular context of reconquest of the kingdom of France on the English:

"The name of Radegonde had several meanings: symbol of the city of Poitiers, seat of the second Parliament, so place of resistance in Paris, in the hands of the English and Burgundians, symbol of legitimacy, because the saint was the wife of Clotaire, the son of Clovis, finally a saint who could only attract the graces of heaven, so necessary to the young king. "

She is the only princess of royal blood to have borne this name within the Capetian lineage.

On 22 April 1430 her father promised her in marriage to Sigismund, son of the Archduke Frederick of Austria, Count of Tyrol.

She became ill in Tours in 1445, perhaps suffering from pleurisy contracted after returning on foot from a pilgrimage to the Basilica of Notre-Dame de l'Epine.

She died on 19 March, at the age of 19 years.

She is buried in the Saint-Gatien cathedral of Tours.

Notes

References

Sources

1428 births
1445 deaths
French princesses
Daughters of kings